Daniel, Dan or Danny Wagner may refer to:

Daniel Wagner (footballer) (born 1987), German association football goalkeeper
Daniel Wagner (parathlete) (born 1993), Danish Paralympic athlete
Daniel A. Wagner, UNESCO Chair in Learning and Literacy
Daniel Wagner (actor) (born 1980), German actor in Die Kunst des Krieges
Dan Wagner (born 1963), British Internet entrepreneur 
Danny Wagner (1922–1997), American basketball player
Danny Wagner (musician) (born 1998), drummer for rock band Greta Van Fleet